The Canadian Federation of Independent Business (CFIB) is a non-profit business organization representing the interests and concerns of over 110,000 Canadian owners of small and mid-size enterprises (SMEs) to all three levels of government. Their areas of concerns include tax policy, labour policies and regulatory policy. The CFIB has lobbied to restrict aspects of the social safety net, including minimum wages, employment insurance, and personal leave for employees. The organization's head office is located in Toronto and there is a regional office located in each province. There is also a national office located in Ottawa.

History 
Born out of a 1969 tax protest, the Canadian Federation of Independent Business was officially founded in 1971 by John Bulloch, a small business owner and business professor at Ryerson Polytechnical Institute (now TMU). Bulloch had formed The Canadian Council for Fair Taxation in 1969 to fight the White Paper on Taxation proposed by the then Minister of Finance, Edgar Benson.  Under the terms of the White Paper, Canadian small businesses faced the prospect of an increased tax rate of 50%. The White Paper was ultimately withdrawn and the CCFT was succeeded by the enduring CFIB.

, Dan Kelly (lobbyist) is the president and CEO. He succeeded Catherine Swift.

Membership
Members must be Canadian-based privately owned companies. Business size is not a criterion for membership.

Fundraising 
CFIB's sole source of funding is membership dues; it receives no donations or government funds. As of 2015, the fees ranged from a minimum of $250 a year to $3,500 a year, depending on the size of the business.

Political activity
CFIB describes itself as a non-partisan political advocacy organization working with all federal and provincial parties. However, Professor Gilles LeVasseur says that, for a long time, they exclusively courted the Conservative Party and only started striving for a broader appeal among all federal parties in the 21st century. The group's leader, Dan Kelly (lobbyist), says the perception of CFIB ties to the Conservative Party only existed in the mid-2010s because the Tories had been in power for a long time, and that the organisation also had a close relationship with the Paul Martin's Liberal Party when they were in power.

Political positions 
The CFIB lobbies:

 For right-to-work legislation
 Against funding public transit
 For lower business taxes
 For deregulation
 For raising the Lifetime Capital Gains Tax Exemption
 Against increased contributions to Employment Insurance and the Canada Pension Plan (CPP)
 For privatized pension plans
 Against increasing the minimum wage, calling the idea of a $15 minimum wage a "dumb policy"

Dan Kelly (lobbyist) stood at the podium with finance minister Joe Oliver when he announced cuts to Employment Insurance rates for small businesses. However, the CFIB was at odds with the Harper government when they ended the long-form census. They also opposed the reforms made to the temporary foreign worker program in 2014.

The CFIB had also opposed big bank mergers in Canada.

Positions during the 2019 Federal election
During the 2019 Canadian federal election, the CFIB sided with the United States in criticizing the longstanding Universal Postal Union fees for Chinese shipments. A spokesperson stated that "the United States is raising a valid point about unfairness in international trade. Businesses in China have an unfair advantage when they can ship to a customer in the US or Canada for less than it would cost a Canadian business to ship to that same customer." The Canadian government ultimately supported the United States' position at an extraordinary congress of the union.

Positions during the 2020 Coronavirus Pandemic 

During the COVID-19 pandemic, the federation advocated in favour of subsidies for small business owners and against support for workers.

In March 2020, at the beginning of the crisis, CFIB released a survey of their member businesses claiming that one third of them feared imminent closures without significant government assistance. CFIB criticized Prime Minister Trudeau's March 24 proposal of a 10% wage subsidy for businesses for a maximum of $25,000 as "a drop in the bucket of what is absolutely necessary right now, and certainly a fraction of what is happening in Western Europe." The next year, in July 2021, the CFIB asked the federal government for further subsidies for businesses.

In July 2020, between the first and second waves of infection, the CFIB warned that expanded employment insurance benefits for workers could hurt business owners, and that the safety-net program would "serve as a disincentive for many part-time workers to return to their pre-COVID employment." The CFIB polled 3,389 employers and reported that 27% claimed that workers whom they had laid off declined an offer of re-employment. About 870 business owners also claimed that their former employees preferred to collect the Canada Emergency Response Benefit (CERB) rather than return to work. CFIB president Dan Kelly (lobbyist) said that CERB created a "disincentive" to work, particularly in the hospitality industry, where 45% of recalled workers in "hotels, restaurants and bars" declined the offer to return to work. In a Canadian Press interview, Ian Robb, the Unite Here union's president, said that safety concerns, not CERB, were the problem, as most people's salaries represent much more than the amount CERB offers. Later that month Canada experienced a spike in COVID-19 cases.

Research
CFIB produces research on the Canadian small and medium-sized business sector, based on the views and experiences its members. Issues of concern to the Canadian SME community are identified by CFIB members through surveys, opinion polls and face-to-face visits. Those views and opinions are then delivered to all three levels of government in the form of research reports, meetings and testimony.  These concerns are far ranging but typically include tax policy, labour policies and regulatory policy.  One of CFIB's regular reports is the "Business Barometer", a monthly research report detailing the economic expectations of Canada's small businesses. CFIB also holds an annual "Red Tape Awareness Week" during which they release a number of research reports advocating for deregulation of small business.

References

External links

Political advocacy groups in Canada
Business organizations based in Canada
Conservatism in Canada